Avec le temps is an extended play by French singer-songwriter Isleym. It was released as a digital download on iTunes on 15 November 2010.

Singles
Avec le temps produced 1 single:
 "Avec le temps" was released as the lead single of the EP on 1 April 2011. It peaked at number 79 on the French Singles Chart, and number 47 on the Belgian Ultratip 50 chart in Wallonia.

Track listing

Notes
 "À chaque jour suffit sa peine" was originally performed by Nessbeal.

References

2010 EPs
French-language EPs
7th Magnitude albums
Isleym albums
Albums produced by Skread